Acta Andreae et Matthiae apud Anthropophagos ("The Acts of Andrew and Matthias among the Anthropophagi")  which exists in several Latin manuscript traditions, is the dramatic romance featuring the Apostles Andrew and Matthias among the cannibals, a thriller featuring gory details that was written for a Christian audience in the 2nd century CE. Constantin von Tischendorf published an edited text following Johann Karl Thilo, 1846. 

Acta Andreae et Matthiae in urbe anthropophagarum, according to Richard Adelbert Lipsius, belonged to the middle of the 2nd century. This apocryphal text relates that Matthias went among the cannibals and, being cast into prison, was delivered by Andrew. The narrative is considered to be a Romance and is understood to have no historical value. Heinz Hofmann classes it "secondary apocrypha", that is, one derived from apocryphal sources; the ghoulish man-eaters remind Hofmann of the killing of Socrates by the witch Meroë in Apuleius' Metamorphoses, better known as The Golden Ass. Among the Latin texts of the Acta Andreae et Mattiae, F. Blatt notes how the mss in Codex Casanatensis 1104 particularly expands upon the horror to describe the instruments and vessels the cannibals use for the slaughter.

References

Apocryphal Acts